The following is a list of episodes from the alternate history OVA series Konpeki no Kantai and Kyokujitsu no Kantai, respectively known as the Deep Blue Fleet and Fleet of the Rising Sun. The series features a technologically advanced Imperial Japanese Navy and a different World War II that was brought about by Japanese Admiral Isoroku Yamamoto's revival in the past due to unexplained circumstances.

The 32 episodes of Konpeki no Kantai were released from 1993 to 2003, and the 15 episodes of Kyokujitsu no Kantai were released from 1997 to 2002.

Production team

From episode 25 on, the planning for Konpeki no Kantai was done by Sanae Mitsugi, series composition was done by Ryōsuke Takahashi and character design was done by Masami Suda. The series was directed by Takeyuki Kanda and Hiromichi Matano.   Animation production for Konpeki no Kantai was handled by J. C. Staff.

Episode list
{|class="wikitable" style="width:98%; margin:auto; background:#FFF;"
|- style="border-bottom: 3px solid #CCF;"
! style="width:3em;"  | No.
! Title
|-

{{Episode list
| EpisodeNumber       = 32
| Title               = The Dawn of Asia
| TranslitTitle       = Ajia no akebono
| NativeTitle         = 亜細亜の曙
| NativeTitleLangCode = ja 
| ShortSummary        = The "Sickle Iron Cross" strike force deals much damage to the Japanese fleet in the Atlantic and Indian Oceans (including the loss of the Takemikazuchi just north of Madagascar) and Admiral Oshii reorganizes the survivors. The Japanese also evacuate the population of Tristan da Cunha. Manteuffel declares his victory over the fleet to Hitler, who suddenly fumes that he failed after reading a newspaper that features the Yamato Takeru'''s arrival in New York on a goodwill visit. He has Manteuffel executed by the SS. A German column in the Tian Shan mountains is ambushed by IJA attack helicopters and Mongolian Tiger tanks in a delaying action, to buy time for strategic bombers to go in for the kill. In England, Japanese and British forces push on to liberate London. With the successful stopping of the Germans, Japan joins the US and Britain in Muscat for peace talks with Nazi Germany, which is a success (despite the Third Reich keeping much of its territory and forced to leave all of Siberia). As the war ends in late 1950 (with Hitler plotting his revenge), the Yamato Takeru and the I-3000 are sent into dry dock for maintenance in preparation for another war.
}}

|}

Kyokujitsu no Kantai
The series is a sidestory to Konpeki no Kantai, released in 1997. It further details the story of the IJN's Atlantic fleet, codenamed the Fleet of the Rising Sun, that first appeared in Konpeki no Kantai episode 12.

{|class="wikitable" style="width:98%; margin:auto; background:#FFF;"
|- style="border-bottom: 3px solid #CCF;"
! style="width:3em;"  | No.
! Title
|-

{{Episode list
| EpisodeNumber       = 05
| Title               = 
| TranslitTitle       = geruman hōdai senmetsu sen
| NativeTitle         = ゲルマン砲台殲滅戦
| NativeTitleLangCode = ja 
| ShortSummary        = The Raishuns strike Berlin using a bomb version of the Yamato Takeru's vaporizer shells, which torch several buildings in the government quarter. The Berlin fire service is deployed to put out the blazes. Inside Hitler's headquarters, Japanese agent Yoshiaki Hongo, posing as a fireman, takes pictures of several classified German documents and forcibly kidnaps a genuine fireman who almost caught him in the act. Sensing the danger of a Luftwaffe counterattack, the Tagarasu crew evacuate and let the decoy ship absorb the blow, which includes two barrages from the Heracles guns. The crew, who stand on the English coast watching the ship get hit, are amazed that it withstood heavy pounding before it sinks. The attack helps the real Yamato Takeru home in on the cannons and launches cruise missiles to destroy the facility.
}}

|}

Release informationKonpeki no Kantai was released from 1994 to 2003 on LaserDisc and DVD, with the DVDs containing two episodes each. JC Staff eventually compiled it and Kyokujitsu no Kantai'' into three large DVD boxed sets. The first was released on July 29, 2005 by Tokuma Shoten and Happinet Pictures, only a few days before the 60th anniversary of the end of World War II. The second DVD box set was released on September 23, 2005. The last compilation was released on November 25, 2005. A Blu-ray release of the entire series is also in the works, with the first set scheduled for release on August 3, 2011. The second and third sets are scheduled to be released on November 25, 2011  and February 24, 2012.

References

External links 
 Episode List at official JCStaff page
 Konpeki no Kantai episode list at Tokuma Shoten site
 Kyokujitsu no Kantai episode list at Tokuma Shoten site

Konpeki no Kantai